= Kenner Elias Jones =

Welsh conman with more than 60 criminal convictions

Kenner Elias Jones is a Welsh conman who has more than 60 criminal convictions.
